The Erie doctrine is a fundamental legal doctrine of civil procedure in the United States which mandates that a federal court called upon to resolve a dispute not directly implicating a federal question (most commonly when sitting in diversity jurisdiction, but also when applying supplemental jurisdiction to claims factually related to a federal question or in an adversary proceeding in bankruptcy) must apply state substantive law.

The doctrine follows from the Supreme Court landmark decision in Erie Railroad Co. v. Tompkins (1938). The case overturned Swift v. Tyson, which allowed federal judges sitting in a state to ignore the common law local decisions of state courts in the same state in diversity actions.

Scope
There are two main objectives of the Erie decision: (1) to discourage forum shopping among litigants, and (2) to avoid inequitable administration of the laws.  Broadly speaking, the second objective is sometimes referred to as "vertical uniformity" and is rooted in the idea that in a given state, the outcome of the litigation should not be grossly different just because a litigant filed a claim in a state court rather than a federal court or vice versa.

The Erie doctrine today applies regardless of how the federal court may hear a state claim.  Whether the federal court encounters a state law issue in diversity jurisdiction, supplemental jurisdiction, or bankruptcy jurisdiction, the federal court must honor state common law when deciding state law issues.

In effect, when the U.S. Constitution does not control and Congress has not legislated (or cannot legislate) on a topic, then the laws of the states necessarily govern and state judge-made rules are equally binding on the federal courts as state statutes.

The federal court must determine if either 1) state law is clear as to the case in controversy, or 2) if not, then has the state's highest court ruled specifically on a similar case.  If so, the state law or court ruling must be followed.  But if not, then the federal court must determine how the state's highest court would potentially rule on a matter: for example, it may look to state appellate courts to see how they ruled, and if the state chose not to hear further appeals, the federal court could determine that the high court agreed with the appellate courts. The determination is called an "'Erie guess", though the term "guess" is a misnomer as the federal court must make a reasoned determination in its ruling.

Alternatively though, the court may elect to certify the question to the state's highest court for a ruling on state law in the matter.  Some states, however, do not allow Federal District Courts to certify questions, only the Supreme Court or Federal Circuit Courts of Appeals.

Origin
The Erie case involved a fundamental question of federalism and the jurisdiction of federal courts in the United States.  In 1789, the Congress passed a law still in effect today called the Rules of Decision Act, which states that the laws of a state furnish the rules of decision for a federal court sitting in that state. Thus, a federal court in Texas, hearing a case based on diversity (as opposed to a federal question), has to follow the laws of the applicable state in resolving a case before it.

Swift v. Tyson
The Supreme Court's decision in Swift v. Tyson had defined the laws of the state as meaning only laws passed by legislatures of that state (though Justice Joseph Story writing for the court suggested that federal courts should pay special attention to how the "local tribunals" of a state would resolve a dispute). Thus, on issues of "general common law", a federal court was free to ignore decisions by a state's highest court.

Aftermath of Swift
The decision in Swift resulted in inconsistent judicial rulings in the same state on the same legal issue depending on whether a plaintiff brought a case in state or federal court. In one case, for example, Black and White Taxicab Co. v. Brown and Yellow Taxicab Co. 276 U.S. 518 (1928), the Brown and Yellow Cab Company, a Kentucky corporation, sought to create a business association with the Louisville and Nashville Railroad, where Brown and Yellow would have a monopoly on soliciting passengers of the railroad, effectively eliminating the competition, the Black and White Cab Co. Such an agreement was illegal under Kentucky common law, as interpreted by Kentucky's highest court. Brown and Yellow dissolved itself, reincorporated in Tennessee, and executed the agreement there, where such an agreement was legal, bringing suit against Black and White in a Kentucky federal court to prevent them from soliciting passengers. The federal court upheld the agreement, citing Swift, and arguing that under general federal common law, the agreement was valid. If Brown and Yellow had brought suit in a Kentucky state court, the agreement would not have been upheld.

Erie
The decision in Erie involved a railroad accident.  The plaintiff, Tompkins, was walking alongside Erie's railroad tracks in Pennsylvania when a train passed. An open door struck him and knocked him under the train, severing his arm.  In most states, Tompkins could sue for negligence of the railroad and recover monetary damages for his loss. In Pennsylvania, however, Tompkins would have been considered a trespasser. He was not to recover for an ordinary negligence claim in the state court of Pennsylvania, because under the law of that state, a claimant had to show "wanton" negligence on part of the Defendant to recover.

Thus, Tompkins brought his case in federal court to avoid the unfavorable state law. He subsequently won. However, on appeal the Supreme Court held, in an opinion drafted by Justice Brandeis, that such decisions and inconsistent rulings based on a general federal common law were unconstitutional, and that decisions by a state supreme court were "laws" that federal courts were bound to follow under the Rule of Decision Act.  Brandeis noted that the Court felt that Swift allowed federal courts to make unconstitutional modifications of the substantive law of a state. He noted that it violated the right to equal protection under the law, although he did not mean it in the sense of the Fourteenth Amendment. The Court overturned Swift on its own initiative, since the parties in Erie did not ask the Court to do so.

Development
Several later cases have added to the vague Erie decision (Brandeis cited no provision of the Constitution that Swift violated, although theoretically it might have violated the Tenth Amendment's reservation of powers to the state).  Speaking generally, there are two approaches in determining whether a federal court will apply a state law: (1) the Hanna & Rules Enabling Act approach, per  when there is a Federal Rule of Civil Procedure and statute that conflicts with a state law; and (2) the Byrd-Erie approach when there is not a conflict between a state and federal practice.

Byrd-Erie
This approach suggests that unless there is a major countervailing federal policy that trumps the state practice, if ignoring the state law would lead to forum shopping by plaintiffs and unequal administration of the laws (like in Yellow Cab above), the court should apply the state law. In Byrd v. Blue Ridge Rural Electrical Cooperative, Inc., the Court decided that the federal policy allocating responsibilities between judge and jury, as embodied in the 7th Amendment of the US Constitution, outweighed the state rule requiring a judge to decide whether an employer was immune from suit. The main goal of the Erie decision was to prevent "forum-shopping," a practice where plaintiffs choose a legal forum simply because of the probability of a more favorable ruling.  The main problem with the decision is that sometimes there is simply no state law or practice on which a federal court may defer. Federal judges are left to guess how a state court would rule on a given legal question, and a state court is in no way bound by a federal decision interpreting their own state law.

Justice Frankfurter in Guaranty Trust Co. v. York,  summarizes the main point of Erie differently... 

In essence, the intent of that decision was to ensure that, in all cases where a federal court is exercising jurisdiction solely because of the diversity of citizenship of the parties, the outcome of the litigation in the federal court should be substantially the same, so far as legal rules determine the outcome of a litigation, as it would be if tried in a State court....

This suggests that Erie's main goal was to achieve equal protection under the law.  One way that equal protection is intentionally disregarded would be through  "forum shopping,"  but the reduction of inequality was the main target of the doctrine.

Hanna
Under the approach in Hanna v. Plumer, the federal court of a state hearing a case based on diversity jurisdiction should apply state law in the event of conflict between state and federal law - or in the absence of relevant federal positive law - if the state law deals with substantive rights of state citizens. The Supreme Court has defined substantive rights as, "rights conferred by the law to be protected and enforced by the adjective law of judicial procedure."  An example of a substantive right would be a state law on fraud, which may vary widely in composition depending on the jurisdiction. If the state law is merely procedural, or relating merely to the form and mode of judicial operations, then the federal court does not have to apply the conflicting state law. However, the substance-procedure distinction is a generality as the Court rejected any test based upon "litmus paper criterion."   Thus, a choice between state and federal law must be made with reference to the underlying policy of the Erie decision.

The Court announced a modification of the "outcome-determinative" test in York,  whereby the test must be applied in light of the twin aims of Erie, which are the discouragement of forum-shopping and avoidance of inequitable administration of the laws. Under this rule, state procedural law would not supplant federal procedural law if the differences in the outcome are nonsubstantial or trivial,  fail to raise Equal Protection concerns,  and are unlikely to influence the choice of forum.

Gasperini 
A more recent Supreme Court case that addressed the Erie problem is Gasperini v. Center for Humanities, .  Gasperini is a post-Hanna decision addressing a conflict between state and federal law for review of jury verdicts. The plaintiff, a well-known artist and photographer from New York, sued a New York museum in federal court in New York, for damages arising from the loss of some photographs and slides he had loaned the museum. A jury found in his favor and awarded damages. The defendant appealed, and the U.S. Court of Appeals for the Second Circuit reduced the damages award on appeal. Gasperini appealed to the U.S. Supreme Court.

The New York state provision, a "tort reform" measure, allowed reviewing appellate courts to overturn a jury verdict if it "deviates materially from what would be reasonable compensation."  Pursuant to this law, the Second Circuit applied the state's appellate standard of review. However, the Supreme Court stated that federal courts, bound by the reexamination clause of the Seventh Amendment, could overturn a jury's finding of fact only if it "shocked the conscience."

The Supreme Court could have resolved the case by reading the Seventh Amendment broadly, and treating it as controlling in federal court. However, instead, the Court opted for what can be described as a compromise, holding that the federal court should apply the state's lower standard of review, but in a way that would not run afoul of the Seventh Amendment: instead of the federal appeals court reviewing the jury finding, the trial judge would assume the role.

Gasperini, and another recent Erie-area case, Semtek International Inc. v. Lockheed Martin Corp., have shown Erie has gone in a newer and even more complicated direction than the previous controlling cases, and that instead of selecting either federal or state law for a case, the federal court may be required to somehow blend federal and state law, depending on the issue. This is quite frustrating for those who wish to have a black-letter rule that will point them to the answer. However, the possibility of blending in Erie does not open up an infinitude of possibilities. In both Gasperini and Semtek, the common thread is that the blending is done in a way that is calculated to advance the aims of Erie (and York): non-discrimination between litigants, and discouragement of forum shopping.

References

United States civil procedure
Legal doctrines and principles
United States Erie Doctrine